Polynuclear may refer to:

Chemistry

 multiple rings in a polycyclic compound

Biology

 Multinucleate, containing multiple nuclei